Nini may refer to:

Geography
 Nini River, Ghana
 Nini Suhien National Park, Ghana

Film and television
 Ninì Tirabusciò: la donna che inventò la mossa, an Italian comedy film
 Nini's Treehouse, a children's television series
 Nini Salazar-Roberts, a character from High School Musical: The Musical: The Series

People

Given name
 Nini Bulterijs, Belgian composer
 Niní Cáffaro, Dominican singer
 Nini Camps, American folk rock singer-songwriter
 Niní Gordini Cervi, Italian actress
 Nini Haslund Gleditsch, Norwegian political activist
 Niní Marshall, Argentine humorist and actress
 Nini Stoltenberg, Norwegian television personality
 Nini Roll Anker, Norwegian novelist and playwright
 Nini Rosso, Italian jazz trumpeter and composer
 Nini Theilade, Danish ballet dancer
 Nini Wacera, Kenyan actress
 Rebecca Ynares, Filipino politician
 Ni Ni, Chinese actress
 Ni Ni Khin Zaw, Burmese pop singer

Surname
 Achinoam Nini, Israeli musician
 Alessandro Nini, Italian musician
 Enzo Nini, Italian musician

Other uses
 Nini, one of the fuwa (Beijing Olympics mascots)

See also
 Ninni